Shirley Vance Wilkins, Jr. (born August 12, 1936) is a retired American politician of the Republican Party. He was a member of the Virginia House of Delegates from 1978 to 2002. In 2000 he became the first-ever Republican Speaker of the Virginia House and first non-Democratic Speaker since the Readjuster Party controlled the House in the early 1880s.

Wilkins was considered the driving force in the expansion of Republican House membership in the 1980s and 1990s, especially after he became minority leader in 1992. In his first term as Speaker, he oversaw the redistricting of the House after the 2000 census that led to an increase in the Republican majority from 52–47 (1 independent) to 64–34 (2 independents) after the November 2001 election.

Voting record
The Republican political record of Vance Wilkins is well-summarized by the Virginia state website: "Vance Wilkins was a strong conservative, working for lower taxes, right-to-work laws, and gun-ownership rights." Wilkins supported the Republican values of limited sex education and limited abortion, in a county - Amherst, Virginia - which had the highest teen pregnancy rate in the nation during his tenure.

Eavesdropping scandal 
In March 2002, Republican Party of Virginia Chairman Edmund Matricardi III (R) pled guilty to eavesdropping on a Democratic Party conference call. State Attorney General Jerry Kilgore (R) investigated, which expanded to include Speaker Vance Wilkins and his chief of staff, Claudia D. Tucker, who pled guilty resigned, was fined $1,000 and given a year probation.

Resignation from Virginia House and House Speakership due to multiple sexual harassment accusations 
June 7–14, 2002, The Washington Post reported that executives of Wilkins' former construction company had revealed that Wilkins had paid $100,000 to a former political staffer, Jennifer L. Thompson, to keep quiet about "unwelcome sexual advances" by Wilkins. Multiple women came forward subsequently, claiming similar harassment - so the Post says he may have resigned to avoid further public contempt. Under pressure from Kilgore and his own Republican caucus, Wilkins resigned as Speaker a week later, and then resigned from the House shortly afterward.

Notes

External links
 

|-

|-

|-

1936 births
Living people
Speakers of the Virginia House of Delegates
Republican Party members of the Virginia House of Delegates
Virginia Tech alumni
People from Amherst, Virginia
20th-century American politicians